Prince Charming is the stock character of fairy tales.

Prince Charming may also refer to:

Fictional characters
 Prince Charming (Fables), in the comic book series Fables
 Prince Charming (Shrek), in the Shrek films
 Prince "Charming" David / David Nolan, in Once Upon a Time series

Disney
Prince Charming suits most heroes of a number of traditional Disney's version of folk tales: 
Cinderella (1950 film)
Snow White (1937 film)
Sleeping Beauty (1959 film)

Titled expressive works
 Prince Charming (album), by Adam & the Ants
 "Prince Charming" (Adam & the Ants song)
 "Prince Charming", song by Metallica, from Reload
 Prince Charming (1942 film), a French film directed by Jean Boyer
 Prince Charming (1999 film)
 Prince Charming (2001 film)
 Prince Charming (manga)
 Prince Charming, the autobiography of Christopher Logue
 Prince Charming, novel by Rachel Hawkins

See also
 Finding Prince Charming, an American TV show